Bernard René Michel Casoni (born 4 September 1961) is a French football manager and former professional player who played as a defender. In his playing career he played for Olympique Marseille and France at Euro 1992. He is the manager of MC Oujda.

Career

Managerial career

Évian
In January 2010, Casoni was named manager of Évian Thonon Gaillard FC whom he guided two successive promotions. In his first year, Championnat National side Évian reached the top of the league and then promoted to the Ligue 2 in the next season. In the 2010–11 Ligue 2, Évian won the Champion titles for the second straight year and secured promotion to the Ligue 1 for the first time since established in 2003. He voluntarily resigned from his position on 2 January 2012 in the winter break of the season.

Auxerre
On 17 March 2014, Casoni was sacked as coach of AJ Auxerre with the club just one point above the second tier's relegation zone.

Videoton
On 10 June 2015, Casoni was appointed as the coach of the Hungarian League club Videoton FC of Székesfehérvár. On 19 August 2015, Casoni was sacked from Videoton after four defeats in five Nemzeti Bajnokság I matches in the 2015–16 season and after one victory and two draws and one defeat in the 2015–16 UEFA Champions League. Casoni's early farewell was hugely affected by the resignation of the club director of Videoton, Győző Burcsa.

In an interview with the Hungarian sport magazine, Nemzeti Sport, Casoni said that he was disappointed by Videoton since the club let their key players (Nikolić, Calatayud, and Sándor) to be signed by other clubs and no new quality players were signed to replace them. In the interview, he also said that players like Ádám Gyurcsó and István Kovács were of mediocre quality.

Al-Khor SC
On 25 September 2018, Casoni was appointed as the new head coach of Al-Khor SC.

Honours

Player
Marseille
Division 1: 1990–91, 1991–92
UEFA Champions League: 1992–93; runner-up: 1990–91
Division 2: 1994–95

Manager
Videoton
Hungarian Super Cup runner-up: 2015

References

External links

Player biography (Sport24.com). 
Bernard Casoni: Player stats. (Om-passion.com) 

1961 births
Living people
Sportspeople from Cannes
French footballers
AS Cannes players
SC Toulon players
Racing Club de France Football players
Olympique de Marseille players
Ligue 1 players
Ligue 2 players
UEFA Euro 1992 players
UEFA Champions League winning players
France international footballers
Association football defenders
French football managers
Olympique de Marseille managers
AS Cannes managers
Étoile Sportive du Sahel managers
Stade Tunisien managers
Armenia national football team managers
SC Bastia managers
Thonon Evian Grand Genève F.C. managers
Club Africain football managers
AJ Auxerre managers
Valenciennes FC managers
Fehérvár FC managers
FC Lorient managers
MC Alger managers
Al-Khor SC managers
MC Oran managers
Ligue 1 managers
Tunisian Ligue Professionnelle 1 players
Algerian Ligue Professionnelle 1 players
Qatar Stars League managers
Botola managers
French expatriate football managers
Expatriate football managers in Tunisia
French expatriate sportspeople in Tunisia
Expatriate football managers in Armenia
Expatriate football managers in Hungary
French expatriate sportspeople in Hungary
Expatriate football managers in Algeria
French expatriate sportspeople in Algeria
Expatriate football managers in Qatar
French expatriate sportspeople in Qatar
Expatriate football managers in Morocco
French expatriate sportspeople in Morocco
Nemzeti Bajnokság I managers
Footballers from Provence-Alpes-Côte d'Azur